Adam Clune (born 8 June 1995) is a professional rugby league footballer who plays as a  for the Newcastle Knights in the NRL. He has previously played for the St. George Illawarra Dragons.

Background
Clune played his junior rugby league for the Junee Diesels, Albion Park-Oak Flats Eagles and Western Suburbs Red Devils.

Playing career

2020
Clune made his debut in round 4 of the 2020 NRL season for St. George Illawarra against the Canterbury-Bankstown Bulldogs.

He played 15 games for the club in his debut season as they finished 13th on the table and missed out on the finals.

2021
Clune scored his first NRL try in round 1 of the 2021 NRL season against local rivals Cronulla-Sutherland.

In August, he signed a two-year contract with the Newcastle Knights starting in 2022.

Clune played a total of 10 matches for St. George Illawarra in the 2021 NRL season as the club finished 11th on the table and missed out on the finals.

2022
Clune played a total of 18 matches for Newcastle in the 2022 NRL season as the club finished 14th on the table and missed the finals.

References

External links
Newcastle Knights profile
St. George Illawarra Dragons profile

1995 births
Living people
Australian rugby league players
St. George Illawarra Dragons players
Newcastle Knights players
Rugby league halfbacks
Rugby league players from Orange, New South Wales